Neang Champa Meas is a 1970 Khmer film directed by Saravuth and stars Vann Vannak and Vichara Dany.

Cast 
Vann Vannak
Vichara Dany
Kim Nova

Soundtrack 
Snae Champa Meas by Sinn Si Samouth and Ros Serey Sothear
Snaeha Champa Meas by Sinn Si Samouth and Ros Serey Sothear
Kom Kot Bong Ey  by Sinn Si Samouth and Ros Serey Sothear
Lea Huy Kam Sne Lokey by Roa Serey Sothea

References 
 

1970 films
Khmer-language films
Cambodian drama films